Vladimir Andreyev (6 October 1878 – 16 April 1940) was a Russian Empire fencer. He competed in the individual and team sabre events at the 1912 Summer Olympics.

References

1878 births
1940 deaths
Male fencers from the Russian Empire
Olympic competitors for the Russian Empire
Fencers at the 1912 Summer Olympics